The 1907 Wyoming Cowboys football team represented the University of Wyoming as an independent during the 1907 college football season. In their first season under head coach Robert Ehlman, the team compiled a 2–1 record and was outscored by a total of 77 to 68.

Schedule

References

Wyoming
Wyoming Cowboys football seasons
Wyoming Cowboys football